"Headache" is a single written and performed by Frank Black. It was the sole single released from his second solo album, Teenager of the Year, released in 1994. It reached number 53 on the UK charts and number 10 on Billboards Modern Rock Tracks.

Co-produced by Black and Eric Drew Feldman (who had contributed to the Pixies' Trompe le Monde), the "blissfully anthemic" song would later appear on greatest hits compilations for Black.

Retrospective reception
The A.V. Club said the song "embodies all of the off-kilter charm and undeniable catchiness that's made Thompson's work so timeless." Interviewer Sean O'Neal described it as, "one of the greatest pop songs ever written." The Quietus said, "The tune is as deliciously catchy and Orbinsonesque [sic] as anything he'd previously written, but underlaid throughout the verse with a bassline that keeps ascending to denote pressure, it culminates in a remarkable chorus that sounds like pop's most mellifluous migraine."

Promotion
The black and white video for the song was directed by Adam Bernstein, famous at the time for his work with They Might Be Giants.

Personnel
Frank Black – vocals, guitar
Eric Drew Feldman – bass, keyboards
Nick Vincent – drums

Technical
Frank Black – co-producer
Eric Drew Feldman – co-producer
Efren Herrera – engineer
Bill Cooper – engineer
David Bianco – engineer, mixing
Frank Gryner – assistant engineer
Matt Westfield – assistant engineer
John Jackson – assistant engineer
Michael Halsband – photography
v23 – design

References 

1994 songs
4AD singles
Black Francis songs
Songs written by Black Francis